The Guerrero Nahuatl language is a Nahuan language spoken by about 125,000 people in Mexico.

Language
It is also known as Guerrero Aztec and Náhuatl de Guerrero. It is spoken in various municipalities of along the Balsas River including Tepecoacuilco de Trujano, Huitzuco de los figueroa, Atenango del Río, Copalillo, Mártir de Cuilapan, Zitlala, Tixtla de Guerrero, Mochitlán, Quechultenango, Chilapa de Álvarez, Ahuacuotzingo, Olinalá, Atlixtac, Zapotitlan Tablas, Ayutla de los Libres, Cualác, Huamuxtitlán, Xochihuehuetlán, Tlapa de Comonfort, Alpoyeca, Xalpatláhuac, and Alcozauca de Guerrero. It is written in the Latin script. There is some video material in addition to a dictionary in this language. It is a subject–verb–object ordered language. The words tend to be long with affixes and clitics. Guerrero Nahuatl is not tonal.

"A long 'l' for other variants is pronounced 'j'l (hl) so the word for 'house', which is 'calli' elsewhere in Nahuatl, is pronounced 'cajli' or 'káhli' in Guerrero."

References

Sources

External links 
Collections in the Archive of the Indigenous Languages of Latin America

Audio of Guerrero Nahuatl 
. Downloadable book in English or Spanish
 Náhuatl de Guerrero Nuevo Testamento, available at Lulu.com 

OLAC resources in and about the Guerrero Nahuatl language

Nahuatl, Guerrero
Nahuatl
Guerrero
Subject–verb–object languages

Uto-Aztecan languages